The Picture Show Man is a 1977 Australian film about a travelling film exhibitor (John Meillon) in the 1920s. He has to deal with the rebelliousness of his son (Harold Hopkins) and a rival American exhibitor (Rod Taylor).

The film was Rod Taylor's first role in an Australian film for over twenty years. He was cast as an American because the producer was concerned about his ability to perform in an Australian accent.<ref>Stephen Vagg,'Rod Taylor: An Aussie in Hollywood, Bear Manor Media 2010 p 191-198</ref>

Premise
Maurice Pym is a travelling cinema operator in the 1920s who tours country New South Wales with his son Larry and pianist Freddie.

Cast
Rod Taylor as Palmer
John Meillon as Mr Pym
John Ewart as Freddie
Harold Hopkins as Larry
Patrick Cargill as Fitzwilliam
Yelena Zigon as MadameCavalli
Garry McDonald as Lou
Sally Conabere as Lucy
Judy Morris as Miss Lockhart
Gerry Duggan as Hall Secretary

Production
The film was based on the memoirs of Lyle Penn, whose father was a travelling film exhibitor. He saw Joan Long being interviewed on television about her documentary on early Australian cinema, The Pictures That Moved and sent his memoirs to her. She optioned them and adapted it into a screenplay. Long was reluctant to direct the movie herself and as such hired John Power.

The film was funded by the Australian Film Commission ($250,000), the New South Wales government ($120,000), the Women's Film Fund, private investors and with support from then-Premier of New South Wales Neville Wran.

Shooting commenced on 17 October 1976 and went until 4 December, a total of seven weeks. It took place in and around Tamworth. Relations between Joan Long and John Power were not always smooth, the two occasionally clashing over interpretation.

Release

Box office
The film was a medium success at the box office. It won Australian Film Awards for Best Art Direction, Costume Design and Supporting Actor (Rod Taylor).

Home mediaThe Picture Show Man'' was released on DVD with a new print by Umbrella Entertainment in July 2005. The DVD is compatible with all region codes and includes special features such as the original theatrical trailer, an interview with Rod Taylor, and audio commentary with Harold Hopkins, Sally Conabere, Judy Morris and Sue Milliken.

References

External links

The Picture Show Man at The Rod Taylor Site
The Picture Show Man at Australian Screen Online
The Picture Show Man at Oz Movies

Australian comedy-drama films
1977 films
Films about filmmaking
Films scored by Peter Best (composer)
1970s English-language films
Films directed by John Power